The Chern Medal is an international award recognizing outstanding lifelong achievement of the highest level in the field of mathematics. The prize is given at the International Congress of Mathematicians (ICM), which is held every four years.

Introduction
It is named in honor of the late Chinese mathematician Shiing-Shen Chern. The award is a joint effort of the International Mathematical Union (IMU) and the Chern Medal Foundation (CMF) to be bestowed in the same fashion as the IMU's other three awards (the Fields Medal, the Abacus Medal, and the Gauss Prize), i.e. at the opening ceremony of the International Congress of Mathematicians (ICM), which is held every four years. The first such occasion was at the 2010 ICM in Hyderabad, India.

Each recipient receives a medal decorated with Chern's likeness, a cash prize of $250,000 (USD), and the opportunity to direct $250,000 of charitable donations to one or more organizations for the purpose of supporting research, education, or outreach in mathematics.

Laureates

See also
 Fields Medal
 Gauss Prize
 International Congress of Mathematicians (ICM)
 International Mathematical Union (IMU)
 Nevanlinna Prize
 List of mathematics awards

Notes

References
, International Mathematical Union
Press release, International Mathematical Union
Program Guidelines, International Mathematical Union

Awards of the International Mathematical Union